Amar Sharadrao Kale is a member of the 13th Maharashtra Legislative Assembly. He represents the Arvi Assembly Constituency. He belongs to the Indian National Congress.

References

Maharashtra MLAs 2014–2019
Indian National Congress politicians
Living people
People from Wardha district
Marathi politicians
Year of birth missing (living people)
Indian National Congress politicians from Maharashtra